Sinibaldo de Mas i Sans (1809, Barcelona – 1868, Madrid) was a known Spanish diplomat to Asia during the 19th century. An adventurer and a poet, he introduced photography in the Philippines in 1841. He was also a Spanish ambassador to Macau. He was also a supporter of Iberian federalism.

In the Philippines
De Mas left Spain in 1834. During his two-and-a-half-year stay in the Philippines, de Mas made a living by taking photographs because of limited financial support from the Spanish government. It was believed that de Mas obtained his daguerreotype camera either in Spain or from Bengal, India in 1839. He wrote the Informe sobre el estado de las Filipinas en 1842 (A Report on the Status of the Philippines in 1842).

References

Specific

General
 Sinibaldo de Mas, Spanish-language Wikipedia, es.Wikipedia.org, retrieved on: August 11, 2007
 Rocamora, Jose Antonio. El nacionalismo ibérico: 1732-1936 (Iberian Nationalism: 1732-1936), Publicaciones universidad de Valladolid (language: Spanish).

External links
 Portrait of Sinibaldo de Mas at Seacex.es

1809 births
1868 deaths
Photography in the Philippines
Spanish poets
Spanish photographers
Ambassadors of Spain
Spanish sinologists
Spanish male poets
19th-century poets
19th-century male writers